Aliabad (also known as ‘Alīābād-e Banād Kūk) is a village in Banadkuk Rural District, Nir District, Taft County, Yazd Province, Iran. At the 2006 census, its population was 25, in 9 families.

References 

Populated places in Taft County